Oeste Futebol Clube, commonly referred to as simply Oeste, is a Brazilian association football club based in Barueri, São Paulo. They currently play in the Campeonato Paulista Série A2, the second division of the São Paulo state football league.

Originally from Itápolis in São Paulo state, Oeste was founded on 25 January 1921. They play in black and red shirts, black shorts and red socks.

History
The club was founded in 1921 by two brothers from Rio de Janeiro. One was a supporter of Flamengo, while the other was a supporter of Fluminense. A training match against an amateur club from the municipality of Fazenda Itaquerê was set to decide if the club would be named Flamengo or Fluminense. With a victory, the club would be named Flamengo, while if defeated the club would be named Fluminense. The club beat their opponents 3–0, but adopted the name Oeste Futebol Clube, after the Center-West region of São Paulo state, while Flamengo's colors were chosen.

The club competed in the Campeonato Paulista Série A1 for the first time in 2004, after winning the Série A2 in the previous season. The club returned to the Série A1 in 2009, after being defeated by Santo André in the Série A2 final in 2008. Oeste won the 2012 Série C after beating Icasa in the final. In 2016, they sealed a partnership with Grêmio Osasco Audax, 2016 Campeonato Paulista A1 runners-up, for the 2016 Serie B, which included mixing players from both teams in one squad and playing home games at Audax's stadium in Osasco.

In 2017, Oeste was relocated definitely to the city of Barueri, since the Estádio Municipal dos Amaros wasn't allowed to host Série B matches due to its limitations, and the City Hall of Itápolis, owners of the stadium, couldn't reach an agreement with the club.

Symbols
The club's mascot is a jaguar, named after one of the city's main rivers, Rio da Onça (Onça River), onça is Portuguese for jaguar.

Stadium
For most of their history, Oeste's home stadium has been the Estádio Municipal dos Amaros, which has a maximum capacity of 6,000 people. In 2016 they played their home games at Prefeito José Liberatti, located in Osasco. From 2017 onwards, they play at the Arena Barueri, in Barueri.

Current squad

Achievements
 Campeonato Brasileiro Série C:
 Winners (1): 2012
 Campeonato Paulista do Interior:
 Winners (1): 2011
 Campeonato Paulista Série A2:
Winners (1): 2003
 Runners-up (2): 2008, 2018
 Campeonato Paulista Série A3:
 Winners (2): 1992, 2002
 Runners-up (1): 1999
 Campeonato Paulista Segunda Divisão:
 Winners (1): 1998
 Campeonato Paulista Série B2:
 Winners (1): 1997
 Copa Paulista:
 Winners (1): 1981

References

External links
 

 
Association football clubs established in 1921
Football clubs in São Paulo (state)
1921 establishments in Brazil